Rizal's 2nd congressional district is one of the six congressional districts of the Philippines in the province of Rizal. It has been represented in the House of Representatives of the Philippines since 1916 and earlier in the Philippine Assembly from 1907 to 1916. The district consists of the municipalities of Baras, Cardona, Jalajala, Morong, Pililla, Tanay and Teresa. It is currently represented in the 19th Congress by Emigdio P. Tanjuatco III of the Liberal Party (LP).

In 2021, the towns of Rodriguez and San Mateo, which have been part of the 2nd district since its creation, have been separated from the district to form their own respective legislative districts as the 3rd and 4th legislative districts of Rizal respectively. by virtue of Republic Act No. 11533. Their first representatives are elected in the 2022 Philippine general elections.

Representation history

Election results

2022

2019

2016

2013

2010

See also
Legislative districts of Rizal

References

Congressional districts of the Philippines
Politics of Rizal
History of Metro Manila
1907 establishments in the Philippines
Congressional districts of Calabarzon
Constituencies established in 1907